Crassatelloidea is a superfamily of bivalves in the order Carditida. In the World Register of Marine Species (WoRMS), Astartoidea is considered a junior synonym of Crassatelloidea, whereas in ITIS Astartoidea is a separate family containing Astartidae and Cardiniidae – Cardiniidae itself being classified instead in Carditoidea by WoRMS.

List of families 
According to ITIS:

Crassatellidae

According to the World Register of Marine Species:

 Astartidae
 Crassatellidae

References

External links 
 

 
 
Crassatelloidea at fossilworks

Bivalve superfamilies
Carditida